"No worries" is an expression in Australian English.

No worries may also refer to:

 "No Worries" (Simon Webbe song), 2005
 "No Worries" (Lil Wayne song), 2012
 "No Worries" (Disciples and David Guetta song), 2016
 No Worries (film), a 1994 film directed by David Elfick
 "No Worries," a song by Pogo